Mariusz Fyrstenberg and Marcin Matkowski were the defending champions, but lost in the semifinals to Oliver Marach and Michal Mertiňák.

Oliver Marach and Michal Mertiňák won in the final 7–6(7–2), 7–6(10–8), against Martín García and Sebastián Prieto.

Seeds

Draw

Draw

External links
Draw

Doubles